The arrondissement of La Trinité is an arrondissement in the French overseas region and department of Martinique. It has 10 communes.

Composition

The communes of the arrondissement of La Trinité, and their INSEE codes, are:

 L'Ajoupa-Bouillon (97201)
 Basse-Pointe (97203)
 Grand'Rivière (97211)
 Gros-Morne (97212)
 Le Lorrain (97214)
 Macouba (97215)
 Le Marigot (97216)
 Le Robert (97222)
 Sainte-Marie (97228)
 La Trinité (97230)

History

The arrondissement of La Trinité, containing 10 communes that were previously part of the arrondissement of Fort-de-France, was created in 1965.

Before 2015, the arrondissements of Martinique were subdivided into cantons. The cantons of the arrondissement of La Trinité were, as of January 2015:

 L'Ajoupa-Bouillon
 Basse-Pointe
 Gros-Morne
 Le Lorrain
 Macouba
 Le Marigot
 Le Robert 1st Canton Sud
 Le Robert 2nd Canton Nord
 Sainte-Marie 1st Canton Nord
 Sainte-Marie 2nd Canton Sud
 La Trinité

References

La Trinite